James Redd (born October 1, 1942) is a former American football player, coach, and college athletics administrator.  He was the 14th head football coach at Northwest Missouri State University in Maryville, Missouri.  He held that position for seven seasons, from 1976 until 1982.  His career coaching record at Northwest Missouri State was 29–42–2

Head coaching record

References

1942 births
Living people
Northwest Missouri State Bearcats athletic directors
Northwest Missouri State Bearcats football coaches
Northwest Missouri State Bearcats football players
Northwest Missouri State University faculty
Oklahoma State University alumni
University of Colorado Boulder alumni
William Jewell Cardinals athletic directors